Tagana-an, officially the Municipality of Tagana-an (Surigaonon: Lungsod nan Tagana-an), is a 5th class municipality in the province of Surigao del Norte, Philippines. According to the 2020 census, it has a population of 17,323 people.

It was created by virtue of Republic Act No. 194 on June 22, 1947.

Geography

Barangays
Tagana-an is politically subdivided into 14 barangays.
 Aurora (Poblacion)
 Azucena (Poblacion)
 Banban
 Sitio Dijo (under barangay Banban)
 Cawilan
 Fabio
 Himamaug
 Laurel
 Lower Libas
 Opong
 Patino
 Sampaguita (Poblacion)
 Talavera
 Union
 Upper Libas

Climate

Demographics

Economy

References

External links
Tagana-an Profile at PhilAtlas.com
Tagana-an Profile at the DTI Cities and Municipalities Competitive Index
[ Philippine Standard Geographic Code]
Philippine Census Information
Local Governance Performance Management System

Municipalities of Surigao del Norte